Irwin Leslie Burch (October 9, 1856 – February 23, 1939) was an American politician.  He served in the South Dakota State Senate from 1891 to 1892.

References

South Dakota state senators
1856 births
1939 deaths
People from Howard, South Dakota